The men's BMX competition of the cycling events at the 2011 Pan American Games was held on October 21 at the CODE San Nicolás in Guadalajara. The defending champion is Jason Richardson of United States.

Schedule
All times are Central Standard Time (UTC-6).

Results

Qualification
First 4 riders in each heat qualify to semifinal.

Semifinal
The top four cyclists advanced to the final.

Final

References

Cycling at the 2011 Pan American Games
2011 in BMX
BMX at the Pan American Games